James Fowler High School is a high school in Calgary, Alberta, Canada, in the neighborhood of Highland Park. The school is part of the Calgary Board of Education's public school system, and currently has approximately 859 students attending the school as of September 2017.

About the school
James Fowler High School was built in 1962 and covers an area of about 13.34 acres of land. The 1563+ student school offers a general program for grades 10-12 as well as an "Arts-Centred Learning" program that employs an Artist in Residence. The school also offers both a K&E (Knowledge and Employability) program and a PLP (Paced Learning) program as well.

Curriculum
James Fowler High School has many different courses that students can participate in while going to James Fowler High School, such as Robotics, Foods, Computer Science, Music, Computer Applications, Art and various other courses. The regular, core classes offered in most schools such as English, Social Studies, Science, Mathematics, Physical Education, and various others are also offered. There are also various clubs that students can take part in while going to the school.

References

High schools in Calgary
Educational institutions established in 1962
1962 establishments in Alberta